Cereus pedunculatus or the daisy anemone is a species of sea anemone in the family Sagartiidae. It is found in shallow parts of the northeast Atlantic Ocean and in the North Sea and the Mediterranean Sea. It is an omnivore, predator and scavenger.

Description
C. pedunculatus has a base that is sometimes frilled at the edge. It is wider than the trunk which is covered with small dots and can be cream, pink, brown or violet. The trunk may be stalk-like and up to ten centimetres tall, or shaped more like a trumpet. Both these forms can retract back into a squat, tentacle-fringed mound. The oral disc may be seven centimetres wide or even wider. There are more than 500 short, flaccid tentacles which may be a plain colour, banded or speckled.

Distribution and habitat
C. pedunculatus is found in the northeast Atlantic Ocean south to the Azores, in the North Sea and the Mediterranean Sea at depths down to 50 metres. It is common round the southern and western coasts of the British Isles. It may grow in rock pools, often with the base and column concealed in a crevice, or it may be found in muddy gravel where it is anchored to a stone or other sub-surface object. In this case, the tentacles are the only part that project and the whole animal can be withdrawn into the substrate if danger threatens.

References

External links
 

Sagartiidae
Cnidarians of the Atlantic Ocean
Fauna of the Mediterranean Sea
Animals described in 1777
Taxa named by Thomas Pennant